is a district of Tokyo located in Bunkyō, due north of the Tokyo Imperial Palace and west of Ueno.

History
Hongō was a ward of the former city of Tokyo until 1947, when it merged with another ward, Koishikawa, to form the modern Bunkyō.

Transportation
Hongō-sanchōme Station (Marunouchi Line and Toei Oedo Line) is in the center of this Ward, which is main station of this ward.

Education
Hongō is home to the University of Tokyo, Juntendo and Toyo Gakuen Universities. There are many schools and universities in this ward and it has been regarded as a school zone since Meiji era.

Bunkyo Board of Education operates the local public elementary and middle schools.

Zoned elementary schools for parts of Hongo are:
Hongo (本郷小学校) for 1-2 and 4-5-chome
Yushima (湯島小学校) for 3 and 7-chome
Seishi (誠之小学校) for 6-chome

Zoned junior high schools for parts of Hongo include:
Hongo (郷台中学校) for 1-5 and 7-chome
No. 6 (第六中学校) for 6-chome

Notable people
 Yaoya Oshichi – greengrocer's daughter who was burned at the stake for arson in 1683.

References

External links
the website of Bunkyo-ku(English)

Districts of Bunkyō